Studio X  (formerly known as Bad Animals Studio and Kaye-Smith Studios) is a music and media recording studio on 4th Avenue in downtown Seattle, Washington, United States. Originally part of the Kaye-Smith Enterprises media conglomerate founded by Lester Smith and actor Danny Kaye, the studio was used to record commercials and musicians. The studio was re-launched as Steve Lawson Productions by Steve and Debbie Lawson in 1979. The sisters Ann and Nancy Wilson of the band Heart owned the studio from 1991 until 1997, and named it Bad Animals after their 1987 album of the same name. Artists such as Heart, Alice in Chains, Pearl Jam, Soundgarden, Nirvana, Queensrÿche, Mad Season, Foo Fighters, Audioslave, Aerosmith, The Beach Boys, Jerry Cantrell, Eddie Vedder, Duff McKagan, Johnny Cash, B.B. King, Radiohead, R.E.M., Deftones, Soulfly, Steve Vai, and Neil Young have recorded at the studio.

History
In 1991, Nancy and Ann Wilson of the band Heart entered into a partnership with Steve Lawson, who owned Kaye-Smith Studios where many of their 1970s hits, as well as their 1980 album Bébé le Strange, had been recorded. They upgraded the facility to the state-of-the-art, and renamed it Bad Animals Studio. The studio was named after Heart's 1987 album, Bad Animals. Ann and Nancy sold the studio back to the Lawsons in 1997, and it was renamed Studio X.

Several of the Humongous Entertainment games were also recorded by Bad Animals Studios.

In May 1993, Nirvana entered Bad Animals Studios to remix the songs "Heart-Shaped Box" and "All Apologies" for their album In Utero.

The music video for Soundgarden's 1994 single "Fell on Black Days" was filmed at the studio.

In 1997, Steve Lawson sold Bad Animals to Mike McAuliffe, Dave Howe, Charlie Nordstrom and Tom McGurk.

In 1998, the Spice Girls recorded vocals for the song "Boyfriend/Girlfriend", their contribution to the South Park soundtrack at the studio.

In 2001, Bill Brown recorded all of the music for Microsoft's Windows XP operating system with a live orchestra at the studio.

On September 1, 2003, Seattle radio station KNDD 107.7 The End hosted a solo acoustic performance by Thom Yorke at Studio X.

In October 2017, the studio was purchased for $21.6 million by Skanska, which plans to build a 346-unit multifamily tower with ground-floor retail in the building.

On October 31, 2018, Studio X, now managed by Reed Ruddy, moved its location from Belltown to Capitol Hill. Alice in Chains' 2018 album Rainier Fog was the last album recorded at the original studio.

Albums recorded at Bad Animals/Studio X

Partial list.

 Bette Midler (1973) – Bette Midler (as Kaye-Smith Studios)
 Track of the Cat (1975) – Dionne Warwick (overdubbing) (as Kaye-Smith Studios)
 Little Queen (1977) – Heart (as Kaye-Smith Studios)
 M.I.U. Album (1978) – The Beach Boys (as Kaye-Smith Studios)
 Bébé le Strange (1980) – Heart (as Kaye-Smith Studios)
 Greatest Hits/Live (1980) – Heart (as Kaye-Smith Studios)
 Private Audition (1982) – Heart (as Kaye-Smith Studios)
 Automatic For The People (1992) – R.E.M. (mixing)
 Inhaler (1993) – Tad (mixing)
 Desire Walks On (1993) – Heart
 Superunknown (1994) – Soundgarden
 Live Through This (1994) – Hole (mixing)
 Vitalogy (1994) – Pearl Jam
 Above (1995) – Mad Season
 Mirror Ball (1995) – Neil Young
 The Road Home (1995) – Heart (mixing)
 Adrenaline (1995) – Deftones
 Lucy (1995) – Candlebox (mixing)
 Alice in Chains (1995) – Alice in Chains
 Down on the Upside (1996) – Soundgarden
 New Adventures in Hi-Fi (1996) – R.E.M.
 Yield (1998) – Pearl Jam
 Boggy Depot (1998) – Jerry Cantrell
 Heart Presents A Lovemongers' Christmas (1998) – Heart
 13 Ways to Bleed on Stage (2000) – Cold
 Riot Act (2002) – Pearl Jam
 Audioslave (2002) – Audioslave
 Deftones (2003) – Deftones
 Savages (2003) – Soulfly
 Transatlanticism (2003) – Death Cab for Cutie
 Catch Without Arms (2005) – Dredg
 Pearl Jam (2006) – Pearl Jam
 Into the Wild (2007) – Eddie Vedder
 Ukulele Songs (2011) – Eddie Vedder
 Fanatic (2012) – Heart
 The Heist (2012) – Macklemore & Ryan Lewis
 King Animal (2012) – Soundgarden
 Lightning Bolt (2013) – Pearl Jam
 Satyricon (2013) – Satyricon
 Rainier Fog (2018) – Alice in Chains

Film scores recorded at Bad Animals/Studio X
 Army of Darkness (1992)
 Dennis the Menace (1993)
 10 Things I Hate About You (1999)
 Office Space (1999)
 The Way of the Gun (2000)
 The Wedding Planner (2001)
 Vanilla Sky (2001)
 Big Fish (2003)
 Eternal Sunshine of the Spotless Mind (2004)
 Kiss Kiss Bang Bang (2005)
 Into the Wild (2007)
 Orphan (2009)
 The Blind Side (2009)
 Eat Pray Love (2010)
 Carol (2014)
 The Founder (2016)

Video game scores recorded at Bad Animals/Studio X
 Halo 2 Original Soundtrack (2004)
 Star Wars: Republic Commando (2005)
 Halo 3 Original Soundtrack (2007)
 The Incredible Hulk (2008)
 Halo: Reach Original Soundtrack (2010)
 Solitaire Blitz (2012)
 Plants vs. Zombies Adventures (2013)
 Destiny Original Soundtrack (2014)
 Peggle 2 Original Soundtrack (2014)
 Age of Empires II (2013)
 Heroes of Skyrealm (2016)

References

External links
Bad Animals
Studio X

1979 establishments in Washington (state)
Companies based in Seattle
Music of Seattle
Recording studios in Washington (state)